Sriranga III (1642–1678/1681 CE) was the last ruler of the Vijayanagara Empire, who came to power in 1642 following the death of his uncle Venkata III. He was also a great grandson of Aliya Rama Raya.

Early rebellions
Before his accession to the throne, Sriranga III was in rebellion against his uncle Venkata III. He sought help from the Bijapur Sultan and attacked Venkata III in Chandragiri – Vellore in 1638. Another invasion of these two in 1642 was defeated by Venkata III’s army, who were also facing Golkonda armies near Madras. Under these troublesome circumstances Venkata III died, and Sriranga III who was with the Bijapur army deserted them and returned to Vellore and made himself the King of Vijayanagara. Sriranga III brought the English East India Company into South India.

Reign
Many of his nobles like the Nayaka of Gingee and Damarla Venkatadri Nayaka, the chieftain of Madras, had a dislike for him for his mischief in rebelling against the former King. Squabbles among the Sultans of Bijapur and Golkonda helped Sriranga III for a while. In 1644 the Sultan of Golkonda appeared with a vast army, and defeated the weakened ruler Sriranga III capturing many of his southern territories. Sriranga III, now feeling weak decided to demand money from the Southern Nayaks, so he marched south. He granted site of Fort St. George (Madras) to British agents of East India Company in 1640s at Raja Mahal of Chandragiri fort, present day Tirupathi.

Battle of Virinchipuram
In 1646 Sriranga III collected a large army with help from Mysore, Gingee and Tanjore and met the Golkonda forces.

The Deccan forces were losing, but later advanced, when consolidated by additional Sultanate armies from the Deccan. The war went on till 1652. In 1649 Tirumala Nayaka sent his forces supporting the Bijapur ruler, but upon converging at the Gingee Fort, the Madurai forces created chaos and took sides with the Gingee army, when the Bijapur and Golkonda entered into their agreements. This led to the banishment of Gingee Nayak's rule in 1649.

By 1652, Sriranga III was left with only Vellore Fort, which was finally seized by the Golkonda forces. By now he had only the support of Mysore, while Tanjore had submitted to the Muslim forces and the Madurai Nayak ended up paying huge sums to Deccan forces, and all three had to cede large amounts of their territories to the Muslim kingdoms. Sriranga III and his allies were defeated in the resulting Battle of Virinchipuram which took place at the village of Virinchipuram just west of Vellore on the southern banks of the Palar River. The allied Sultanate forces scored a huge victory and Sriranga's forces were forced to retreat. This battle and defeat significantly weakened the authority of Sriranga III.

Last years
Sriranga III spent his last years under the support of one of his vassal chieftains, Shivappa Nayaka of Ikkeri, and was still hoping to retrieve Vellore from the Muslim forces. Thirumala Nayaka's treachery to Sriranga III made the Mysore ruler Kanthirava Narasaraja I wage a series of ravaging wars with Madurai, later capturing the territories of Coimbatore and Salem, regions which were retained by Mysore till 1800. The rule of Vellore was then passed over to the Bijapur Sultanate.

Death
The Mysore ruler Kanthirava Narasaraja I still recognised Sriranga as a namesake emperor. Sriranga died in 1678/1681 as an emperor without an empire, putting an end to over three centuries of Vijayanagara rule in India. Sriranga's only daughter was married to Srivallabha, a descendant of Narasimhacharya.

References

 Thiruvarangam
 
 
 
 Sathianathaier, R. History of the Nayaks of Madura [microform] by R. Sathyanatha Aiyar ; edited for the University, with introduction and notes by S. Krishnaswami Aiyangar ([Madras] : Oxford University Press, 1924) ; see also ([London] : H. Milford, Oxford university press, 1924) ; xvi, 403 p. ; 21 cm. ; SAMP early 20th-century Indian books project item 10819.
K.A. Nilakanta Sastry, History of South India, From Prehistoric times to fall of Vijayanagar, 1955, OUP, (Reprinted 2002) .
Pedda Varadacharya on the descendants of vijayanagara empire.

Further reading
 The Unlucky Sriranga - Posted by cbkwgl in End of Kingdoms, History, Indian Encyclopedia, Vijayanagar

1642 births

17th-century deaths
17th-century Indian monarchs
Tamil Nadu under the Vijayanagar Empire
Indian Hindus
Telugu monarchs